Atlético Ottawa is a Canadian professional soccer club based in Ottawa, Ontario. The club competes in the Canadian Premier League and plays its home games at TD Place. The team was founded in 2020 by Spanish club Atlético Madrid.

History

From 2014 to 2019, Ottawa Fury FC competed in American-based soccer leagues, most recently the USL Championship. The Fury dissolved after the 2019 season due to sanctioning issues associated with competing in the United States with the emergence of the domestic Canadian Premier League. This left Ottawa without a professional soccer team heading into the 2020 season.

On January 29, 2020, it was announced that Ottawa had been awarded the Canadian Premier League's first expansion team to be owned by Spanish club Atlético Madrid with Ottawa businessman Jeff Hunt as a strategic partner. The club debuted in the 2020 Canadian Premier League season under the name Atlético Ottawa.

The club's identity, including name, crest, and colours, was unveiled on February 11, 2020. The day was proclaimed "Atlético Ottawa Day" by Ottawa mayor Jim Watson. Mista was announced as the first head coach and general manager of the club. 

As of their inaugural season, Atlético Ottawa home and away games are broadcast on OneSoccer, and on TSN1200 in radio format.

After playing the 2020 season and start of the 2021 season at neutral-site venues due to the COVID-19 pandemic, Atlético Ottawa made their home debut on August 14, 2021. Over 12,000 spectators were in attendance as Ottawa defeated the HFX Wanderers 2–1.

Following a 3–1 victory over Cavalry FC on September 24, 2022, Atlético Ottawa qualified for the Canadian Premier League playoffs for the first time. On October 8, 2022, Atlético Ottawa clinched the 2022 CPL regular season championship.

Stadium
Atlético Ottawa play at TD Place at Lansdowne Park in the Glebe neighbourhood of Ottawa. The stadium is shared with the Ottawa Redblacks Canadian football team and formerly hosted Ottawa Fury FC and  hosted nine matches from the 2015 FIFA Women's World Cup.

Crest and colours
The club's identity is based upon that of its parent club, Atlético Madrid. The crest features a blue silhouette of the Peace Tower on Ottawa's Parliament Hill. Underneath are red and white stripes, evoking Atlético Madrid's crest and Canada's flag. At the base of the crest is a maple leaf. The club's alternate logo is a canoe paddle crossed by two arrows, taken from the Coat of arms of Ottawa, with the monogram "AO".

Like Atlético Madrid, the club's colours are red, white, and blue (branded by the club as "federal red", "blanc d'Ottawa", and "Rideau blue").

Club culture

Supporters
Atlético Ottawa's two main supporters groups are the Capital City Supporters Group (CCSG) and the Bytown Boys. The two groups are located in Section W of TD Place during home games and have gained a reputation for being a leading example for supporters culture in the Canadian Premier League.

Some notable introductions to the gameday atmosphere from the supporters include Wally, an inflatable dinosaur that has become an adoptive mascot of the supporters section, the "Olliewood" sign on the eastern hill of TD Place, in honour of 2022 CPL Player of the Year Ollie Bassett, and wide variety of characters strewn about the supporters section in non-traditional matchday garb.

The support for the club has continued to grow and manifested in a near sellout crowd of 14,992 for the 2022 Canadian Premier League Final against Forge FC. This marked the largest paid attendance for any Atlético Ottawa match to date.

Honours
 Canadian Premier League
Regular Season: 2022

Players and staff

Squad

Staff

Head coaches

Club captains

Records

Year-by-year 

1. Average attendance include statistics from league matches only.
2. Top goalscorer(s) includes all goals scored in league season, league playoffs, Canadian Championship, CONCACAF League, and other competitive continental matches.
a: Due to the COVID-19 Pandemic, the season was held exclusively in Charlottetown, Prince Edward Island, without fans formatted as a double round robin season with a single match final

Most appearances 

Note: Bold indicates active player

Most goals 

Note: Bold indicates active player

Most assists 

Note: Bold indicates active player

Note: 5 others tied at 2

References

External links

 
2020 establishments in Ontario
Association football clubs established in 2020
Soccer clubs in Ottawa
Canadian Premier League teams